In common law countries, a civil infraction is a non-criminal violation of a rule, ordinance, or regulation.

United States law
A civil infraction is a violation of the law less serious than a misdemeanor, and which usually does not attach certain individual rights such as a jury trial.

Punishments for infractions
In the United States, the key characteristic of an infraction is that the punishment doesn't include any amount of incarceration in a prison or jail or any other loss of civil rightstypically the only punishment is a fine, although sometimes other regulatory actions are possible (e.g. revocation of a license or permit) or an order to remedy or mitigate the situation.

References
       3. https://mjieducation.mi.gov/documents/resources-for-trial-court-staff/178-holt-rev-2015/file

Common law